Herbert A. Linthwaite (June 17, 1858 – December 31, 1929) was an American architect and a member of the AIA Columbus.

H. A. Linthwaite was born in Indiana, and rose to prominence in Columbus, Ohio as an architect from 1879 until 1911, when he moved to Los Angeles, California.

The Garber House, built by Linthwaite in 1922, became a Los Angeles Historic-Cultural Monument in 2007.

He married Sara De Long in September 1879.

He died in Los Angeles in 1929.

Notable works 
Old Columbus Dispatch Building, Columbus Ohio - 68 North High Street. Completed in 1910. The building housed the Columbus Dispatch, the city's daily newspaper, until 1925.
Garber House - Los Angeles, California
The Peruna Company - Columbus, Ohio
The Central Ohio Paper Company - Columbus, Ohio
The Columbus Female Benevolent Society building.

References 

1858 births
1929 deaths
Architects from Indiana
Architects from Columbus, Ohio
Architects from Los Angeles
People from Columbus, Ohio
19th-century American architects
20th-century American architects